Luciano Daniel Pons (born 18 April 1990) is an Argentine professional footballer who plays as a forward for Independiente Medellín.

Career
Pons' career started in 2009 with Argentino, who he remained with for five years whilst scoring thirty-seven goals in one hundred and seven league appearances; in Primera C Metropolitana and Primera D Metropolitana up until 2014. In 2012, Pons joined Venezuelan Primera División side Aragua on loan. He scored two goals, versus Deportivo Anzoátegui and Estudiantes (M), in seven matches for the club. After returning to Argentino, he was loaned to Torneo Argentino B team Jorge Newbery. San Miguel signed Pons on 30 June 2014. He subsequently scored thirty-four times across two seasons.

Pons then completed a move to Primera B Metropolitana's Atlanta ahead of the 2016 campaign. He scored on his second start, netting the winning goal against Estudiantes (BA) on 27 February. That was the opening of eight in his debut season, which preceded a further five in the following 2016–17. August 2017 saw Pons join Flandria of Primera B Nacional. He scored ten goals for Flandria, including one against eventual champions San Martín who ended up signing Pons ahead of their return to the Argentine Primera División on 1 July 2018. He scored four goals in the top-flight, though they'd suffering relegation.

He remained with San Martín in Primera B Nacional, going on to net twelve goals across the 2019–20 campaign; which included a hat-trick over Quilmes on 14 October 2019. The club were sat top of the table at the time of the season's curtailment due to the COVID-19 pandemic. In August 2020, Pons joined Primera División team Banfield.

On 11 January 2022, Pons joined Colombian club Independiente Medellín on a deal for the rest of the year.

Career statistics
.

References

External links

1990 births
Living people
Footballers from Rosario, Santa Fe
Argentine footballers
Association football forwards
Argentine expatriate footballers
Argentino de Rosario footballers
Aragua FC players
Club Atlético San Miguel footballers
Club Atlético Atlanta footballers
Flandria footballers
San Martín de Tucumán footballers
Club Atlético Banfield footballers
Independiente Medellín footballers
Primera C Metropolitana players
Primera D Metropolitana players
Venezuelan Primera División players
Primera B Metropolitana players
Primera Nacional players
Argentine Primera División players